Hockinson High School is a school in Hockinson, Washington. There are just under 700 students.
The official mascot is the Hawk, and the school colors are navy, cardinal blue, and silver.  Built in 2003, it is a part of the Hockinson School District in Clark County, located in the southwest region of the state. It is the only high school in the district. The school is led by principal Tim Fox.

Curriculum

Hockinson High School has a comprehensive curriculum of Language Arts, Math, Social Studies, Science, Art, Foreign Language (Spanish and French), Physical Education, Health, Fine and Performing Arts (Band and Theater), along with Career and Technical education.

Advanced Placement Program (AP) courses include AP English Language & Composition, AP World History, AP United States History, 
AP Comparative Government & Politics, AP Human Geography, AP Calculus, AP Literature & Composition, AP Biology, AP Physics, AP Statistics, AP Spanish Language & Culture, and AP Chemistry.

Hockinson High School participates in the Running Start program with Clark College in Vancouver, Washington to provide juniors and seniors with an opportunity to attend college courses for both high school and future college credit.

Specialized career and technical education is provided by Hockinson High School through the Clark County Skills Center. It is a 
Southwest Washington high school trade and business school open to Juniors and Seniors to provide classes for technical skills the school can't fund.

Activities and clubs
The following activities are offered at Hockinson High School:
 ASB
 Band
 Band Council
 Board & Card Game Club
 Drama
 Equestrian Team
 FBLA
 FIRST Robotics Competition
 GSA
 HHS Theatre Company
 Key Club
 Mock Trial Club 
 National Honor Society
 Skills USA
 Tech Club
 Yearbook

Sports
Hockinson High School currently competes in the Washington Interscholastic Activities Association (WIAA) Greater St. Helens League at the 2A level. Despite being one of the smallest schools in the state’s 2A level, it is highly competitive. 

The school currently fields these sports:
 Baseball
 Boys Basketball
 Girls Basketball
 Cross Country
 Equestrian
 Football
 Boys Golf
 Girls Golf
 Boys Soccer
 Girls Soccer
 Softball
 Boys Swimming
 Girls Swimming
 Girls Tennis
 Track and Field
 Volleyball
 Wrestling

References

External links 
Hockinson High School
Robotics Team Website
Music Department Website
GSHL Football - Hockinson High School
Drama Club Facebook
Art Club Facebook

High schools in Clark County, Washington
Public high schools in Washington (state)
Educational institutions established in 2003
2003 establishments in Washington (state)